The 2016–17 Dialog Rugby League was the 66th season of the top flight of Sri Lankan domestic rugby union competition. The competition is sponsored and broadcast by Dialog TV.

The league consists of 8 clubs playing in a home-and-away double round robin. The standings at the end of the season determine the seedings for the 2017 edition of the Clifford Cup playoffs held in the spring.

The reigning champions of both last year's regular season and the 2016 Clifford Cup is Kandy SC, who claimed their 17th league title after finishing the 2015-2016 season undefeated, two games clear of runners up Havelock SC.

The 2016-17 season was the first season that the SLRFU introduced a Television Match Official (TMO) for selected domestic games.

Kandy SC began the season in dominant form defeating CH&FC 96 to nil in their opening game before losing to Air Force SC the following week in a close game 24 to 21. Before the mid season break at the end of the year Kandy SC lost a second game, this time to Navy SC 32-37. Havelock SC commenced the year with a six-game winning streak, which ended with a 30-39 loss to Kandy SC on 18 December 2016.

In the second half of the season both Kandy SC and Havelock SC continued their respective unbeaten runs, with the title race coming down to the second last game of the season. The resultant win by Kandy SC 26-11 virtually secured the club the title, as whilst both clubs have the same number of wins for the season Kandy SC have more bonus points due to the size of their winning margins over the season. In the final round of the season Kandy SC finished in the same manner as they started by comprehensively defeating CH&FC 59-3, thereby retaining their League title for the 3rd year in a row.

Teams

League table

Table standings updated through 12 February 2017

Try and Points scorers

League Season

Week 1

Week 2

Week 3

Week 4

Week 5

Week 6

Week 7

Week 8

Week 9

Week 10

Week 11

Week 12

Week 13

Week 14

References

2016–17 rugby union tournaments for clubs
2016 in Sri Lankan sport
2017 in Sri Lankan sport
Rugby union competitions in Sri Lanka
Sri Lankan
Sri Lankan